David Wixon Pratt is an American physicist, Professor of Chemistry at the University of Pittsburgh.

He was awarded an A.B. in Chemistry by Princeton University in 1959 and, after serving as a fleet officer in the U.S. Navy from 1959 to 1962, gained a Ph.D. in 1967 from the University of California at Berkeley on magnetic resonance. He then did postdoc research at the University of California at Santa Barbara on optical spectroscopy before moving in 1968 to become Professor of Chemistry at the University of Pittsburgh.

He was awarded the status of Fellow in the American Physical Society, after he was nominated by the Division of Chemical Physics in 1990, for "significant contributions to molecular spectroscopy, particularly the elucidation of intramolecular relaxation in intermediate molecules, and the development of laser-induced phosphorescence spectroscopy and ultrahigh-resolution spectroscopy in supersonic jets". He is a fellow of the American Association for the Advancement of Science and a member of the American Chemical Society.

He was awarded the 1999 APS Earle K. Plyler Prize for Molecular Spectroscopy for "pioneering work in ultrahigh resolution ultraviolet spectroscopy of cold molecules in beams that elucidated the structure and isomerization dynamics of a wide range of large molecules, molecular vibrational dynamics, and hydrogen bonding".

References 

Year of birth missing (living people)
Living people
American physicists
Princeton University alumni
University of California, Berkeley alumni
Pittsburg State University faculty
Fellows of the American Physical Society
Fellows of the American Association for the Advancement of Science